Tom Cavanagh (born 1963) is a Canadian actor.

Tom Cavanagh may also refer to:
Tom Cavanagh (ice hockey) (1982–2011), hockey player 
Tommy Cavanagh (1928–2007), English footballer and coach
Thomas Patrick Cavanagh (born 1945), American aerospace engineer who attempted to sell stealth bomber secrets to the Soviet Union

See also
Thomas Cavanaugh (1869–?), American sailor and Medal of Honor recipient
Tomás Cavanagh (born 2001), Argentine footballer
Tom Kavanagh (born 1970), Australian rules footballer
Thomas Kavanagh (disambiguation)